The Heritage Building is today part of Ottawa City Hall.  It was originally built in 1874 as Ottawa Normal School and served as a teacher's college.  The Gothic Revival building stands at Elgin Street and Lisgar and several extensions were added to the rear of the building.

It was part of Ontario's normal school system of teacher's colleges that had been set up by Egerton Ryerson.  When Ryerson's system was replaced by a more modern system it was renamed the Ottawa Teacher's College in 1953.  In the 1960s it was decided that Ontario's teacher's colleges should be merged into universities and the teacher's college was merged into the Faculty of Education of the University of Ottawa in 1974.  Four years later the building was closed and the building was sold to the federal government.

In 1986 it was purchased by the Regional Municipality of Ottawa-Carleton, to serve as part of a new RMOC headquarters.  To the north of the college the main building of the new RMOC building was erected and links were created to the old school, which was re named the Heritage Building.  With the creation of the new city of Ottawa in 2000 the building became part of Ottawa City Hall.  The mayor has his office in this building, overlooking Elgin Street.

Notable alumni
 Emily Julian McManus (1865-1918), poet and educator

See also
 List of designated heritage properties in Ottawa

References
"Region chooses Teacher's College for headquarters." Hugh Adami. The Ottawa Citizen. Ottawa, Ont.: Feb 27, 1986. pg. A.1.FRO

External links
Ottawa Normal School historicplaces.ca

Buildings and structures in Ottawa
Defunct universities and colleges in Canada
School buildings completed in 1874
Gothic Revival architecture in Ottawa
Teachers colleges in Canada
National Historic Sites in Ontario
Designated heritage properties in Ottawa